The 2017–18 Rutgers Scarlet Knights men's basketball team represented Rutgers University–New Brunswick during the 2017–18 NCAA Division I men's basketball season. The Scarlet Knights, led by second-year head coach Steve Pikiell, played their home games at the Louis Brown Athletic Center in Piscataway, New Jersey as fourth-year members of the Big Ten Conference. They finished the season 15–19, 3–15 in Big Ten play to finish in last place. In the Big Ten tournament, they defeated Minnesota and Indiana before losing to Purdue in the quarterfinals.

Previous season
The Knights finished the 2016–17 season 15–18, 3–15 in Big Ten play to finish in last place. In the Big Ten tournament, they defeated Ohio State in the first round, marking their first ever Big Ten tournament win. However, they lost to Northwestern in the second round.

Offseason

Departures

Incoming transfers

2017 recruiting class

2018 recruiting class

Roster

Schedule and results
The 2018 Big Ten tournament will be held at Madison Square Garden in New York City. Due to the Big East's use of that venue for their conference tournament, the Big Ten tournament will take place one week earlier than usual, ending the week before Selection Sunday. This could result in teams having nearly two weeks off before the NCAA tournament.

|-
!colspan=9 style=|Exhibition

|-
!colspan=9 style=|Regular season

|-
!colspan=9 style=|Big Ten tournament

References

Rutgers Scarlet Knights men's basketball seasons
Rutgers
Rutgers
Rutgers